The New York Attorney General election is held every four years.

1942–1990

1994–present

1994

The 1994 election was held on November 8. Republican Dennis Vacco won an open seat in a close election, as Robert Abrams, the Democratic incumbent, decided not to seek reelection.

5,325,323 ballots were cast. Out of them, 668,840 were declared blank, void or missing.

1998

The 1998 election was held on November 3. Democratic challenger Eliot Spitzer narrowly unseated one-term Republican incumbent Dennis Vacco :

4,985,474 ballots were cast. Out of them, 660,078 were declared blank, void or missing.

2002 

The 2002 election was held on November 5. Democratic incumbent Eliot Spitzer was reelected by a wide margin:

4,690,536 ballots were cast. Out of them, 559,099 were declared blank, void or missing.

2006

The 2006 election was held on November 7. Andrew Cuomo was elected to replace incumbent Eliot Spitzer who successfully ran for governor.

4,701,065 ballots were cast. Out of them, 397,715 were declared blank, void or missing.

2010

The 2010 election was held on November 2, 2010. Eric Schneiderman was elected to replace incumbent Andrew Cuomo who successfully ran for governor.

2014
The 2014 election was held on November 4, 2014. Eric Schneiderman was reelected for a second term.

2018
The 2018 election was held on November 6, 2018. Letitia James was elected to replace Eric Schneiderman, who resigned as attorney general.

2022

See also
 New York gubernatorial elections
 New York state elections
 New York Comptroller elections

References

External links
 New York Elections, informedandenfranchised.com
 Our Campaigns, New York Attorney General